HD 112014 is a star system in the northern constellation of Camelopardalis. It is dimly visible as a point of light with an apparent visual magnitude of 5.92. The distance to this system is approximately 415 light years based on parallax measurements.

The stars HD 112028 and HD 112014 were identified as a double star by F. G. W. Struve in 1820, and are listed as WDS 12492+8325 A and B, respectively, in the Washington Double Star Catalog. The binary nature of component B, or HD 112014, was discovered by J. S. Plaskett in 1919. It is a double-lined spectroscopic binary with an orbital period of 3.29 days and an eccentricity (ovalness) of 0.04. Both components are A-type main-sequence stars.

References

A-type main-sequence stars
Spectroscopic binaries
Triple stars

Camelopardalis (constellation)
Durchmusterung objects
112014
062561
4892